"The Hard Road" is a song by Australian hip hop group, Hilltop Hoods. It is the second single taken from the Australian group's 2006 album of the same name. It was released by Obese Records in 2006 as a CD single and a 12" vinyl single. The CD single also included the music video for the song.

Sampling
The song contains a sample from "Out in the Woods", a composition originally written by Leon Russell.

Track listing

Personnel
 Artwork (graphic design) - Benjamin Funnell 
 Artwork (illustration) - John Engelhardt 
 Mastered - Neville Clark

Release history

References

2005 songs
2006 singles
Hilltop Hoods songs
Songs written by Leon Russell
Songs written by Suffa
Songs written by MC Pressure
Obese Records singles